At the 1952 Summer Olympics in Helsinki, a total number of eleven swimming events were contested, six for men and five for women. The events were held at the Swimming Stadium.  There was a total of 319 participants from 48 countries competing.

Medal table

Medal summary

Men's events

Women's events

Participating nations
319 swimmers from 48 nations competed.

References

 
1952 Summer Olympics events
1952
1952 in swimming